Narramore is a surname. Notable people with the surname include:

Clyde M. Narramore (1916–2015), American writer
Ruth Narramore (1923–2010), American magazine editor, writer, poet and musician